Microplia is a genus of beetles in the family Cerambycidae, containing the following species:

 Microplia agilis Audinet-Serville, 1835
 Microplia nigra Monné, 1976

References

Acanthocinini